Guitarissimo (stylized as guitarissimo) is the debut studio album by Japanese singer-songwriter miwa. The album was released on April 6, 2011.

The album was originally scheduled to release a week earlier, on March 30; however, due to the Tōhoku earthquake and tsunami which happened prior to the original release date as well as its after-effects, the release date was delayed by a week.

Track listing

Charts 
Guitarissimo became the first debut album by a solo singer-songwriter born in the Heisei period to debut at number one, on Oricon's albums chart.

References

External links 
 Sony Music Guitarissimo profile  - CD+DVD; CD-only

2011 debut albums
Sony Music Entertainment Japan albums
Japanese-language albums